Evelyn Groesbeeck Mitchell (1879 – 1964) was an American entomologist and physician.

Life 
Evelyn Groesbeeck Mitchell was born on June 14, 1879, in East Orange, New Jersey. She attended and graduated from East Orange High School. In 1898 she started attending Cornell University. She attended Barnard College for her second year but returned to Cornell the following year and graduated in 1902 with a bachelor's degree. She went to study at George Washington University in 1904 and graduated with a Master of Science degree in 1906. During her studies at George Washington University, she was assistant to Dr. James William Dupree, the Surgeon General of Louisiana at the time. From 1904 to 1912, she was a scientific illustrator at the United States National Museum. She was also a member of the Entomological Society of America.

In 1913, she earned a M.D. from Howard University College of Medicine. From 1913 to 1914 she was an intern at a Women's hospital in Philadelphia and form 1914 onward she was a practicing physician.  She worked as a doctor in Pennsylvania during the 1918 flu epidemic. She was also a visiting neurologist at Freedman's Hospital beginning in 1915. She was superintendent at Park Hospital, and Boston City Hospital. 

Aside from working as a physician, Mitchell also taught at universities and volunteered summer schools for African American students. Additionally, she testified in court to support women who had been assaulted and held a discussion group with prisoners in Norfolk County, Massachusetts.

Evelyn died October 31, 1964.

Works 
 Mosquito Life New York, G. P. Putnams sons, 1907; reprint Wentworth Press 2019, 
 Descriptions of Nine New Species of Gnats Journal of the New York Entomological Society, Vol. 16, No. 1 (Mar., 1908), pp. 7–14 (8 pages)
 AN APPARENTLY NEW PROTOBLATTED FAMILY FROM THE LOWER CRETACEOUS

References

External links

 General Correspondence, 1839-1961; Mitchell, Evelyn, National American Woman Suffrage Association Records, Library of Congress

Created via preloaddraft
1879 births
1964 deaths
American entomologists
East Orange High School alumni
Scientists from New Jersey
People from East Orange, New Jersey
Women entomologists
Women physicians
Cornell University alumni
George Washington University alumni
Howard University College of Medicine alumni
Scientific illustrators